Kylie McCarthy (born 25 September 1987) is an English-born Welsh female international footballer. She plays as a centre back for FA Women's Championship club Lewes L.F.C. for whom she signed in September 2017, and has represented the Wales women's national football team at senior level.

Club career
Davies began playing football at aged six, and joined the women's section of Wimbledon FC as a 10-year-old in 1998. In summer 2004, Davies was approached by Fulham. She decided to stay with AFC Wimbledon but changed her mind when approached again in September 2004. After two years at Fulham, Davies moved to Chelsea in 2006.

During the 2007 and 2008 off-seasons, Davies played in the American W-League for Richmond Kickers Destiny. With Chelsea dormant ahead of the 2011 FA WSL season, Davies featured for Colchester United Ladies.

When Casey Stoney left Chelsea for Lincoln Ladies, Davies inherited the Chelsea captaincy. She transferred from Chelsea to Millwall Lionesses in January 2014, following a brief loan spell.

International career
Davies represented England at the Under-15, 17, 19, 21 and 23 levels. However, she was called into the Wales squad in March 2010 as her grandfather had been born in Pontardawe. Davies made her senior debut for Wales as a 90th-minute substitute, against Belgium that month.

Davies also represented Great Britain at the 2007 Summer Universiade in Bangkok, while a student at Loughborough University.

Honours
Individual
Welsh Footballer of the Year: 2015

References

External links

Kylie Davies at FAW
Kylie Davies at UEFA

Welsh women's footballers
Wales women's international footballers
Fulham L.F.C. players
Reading F.C. Women players
Chelsea F.C. Women players
Millwall Lionesses L.F.C. players
FA Women's National League players
Footballers from Carshalton
1987 births
Living people
Alumni of Loughborough University
Women's Super League players
USL W-League (1995–2015) players
England women's under-23 international footballers
Expatriate women's soccer players in the United States
English women's footballers
Watford F.C. Women players
Women's association football defenders
Lewes F.C. Women players